Estadio Olímpico Municipal Antonio Domínguez Alfonso, otherwise simply known as Estadio Antonio Domínguez Alfonso, is a multi-purpose stadium located in Playa de Las Américas, Arona, Tenerife, Canary Islands, Spain. It is the home ground of Tercera División RFEF (Group 12) side CD Marino. It has a capacity of 7,500 for sporting events, whilst being able to accommodate a capacity of 27,000 for concerts. It has dimensions of 100 x 70 metres.

History 
Constructed in 1969 and opened on 7 September 1969, the stadium is named after Spanish politician Antonio Domínguez Alfonso, who was born in Arona in 1848. Prior to the installation of an artificial grass pitch in 2001, the pitch was composed of dirt.

On 24 November 1998, the Campo Municipal de Fútbol Anexo Antonio Domínguez, otherwise simply known as Anexo Estadio Antonio Domínguez, opened. The 1,000 capacity stadium, which is adjacent to its counterpart stadium, hosts CD Marino B amongst a range of other football teams that make use of the stadium. In 2015, a FIFA Quality Pro artificial pitch was installed at the annex at the cost of €129,000, giving the stadium an artificial playing field of professional standard. 

In August 2011, the stadium played host to the inaugural year of the Arona Summer Festival, an electronic music festival that was headlined by one of the biggest names in dance music, French DJ and producer David Guetta. 

On 25 October 2021, the Royal Spanish Athletics Federation (RFEA) announced that the stadium had been selected to host the 2022 Spanish Masters Athletics Championships, which will see more than 1,500 participants aged 35 and over compete in athletics events. Days prior to the announcement, the council unveiled its plans for an €715,000 upgrade of the stadium, which will see the construction of medical treatment and rehabilitation facilities as well as additional changing rooms and office space. The council estimates the stadium contributes at least €1 million per year to the economy through hotel bookings alone.

Due to its climate, the stadium is often utilised by football teams during pre-season breaks as well as elite athletes who use the venue to train for upcoming events, with double 2022 Tokyo Olympics gold medalist Marcell Jacobs being one of many in most recent times.

Other uses 
With Estadio Antonio Domínguez Alfonso being a multi-purpose stadium, it is able to host non-football events such as concerts, athletics and other sports.

Concerts 
Away from sporting evets, the stadium is capable of providing a suitable space for concerts, being able to accommodate in the region of 27,000 spectators for such events - making it a preferable venue for artists looking to perform on the island as part of their tour dates. Notable performances include Latin music sensation Ricky Martin, Marc Anthony, Malú, Pablo Alborán, Jorge Drexler and Carlos Vives.

Arona Summer Festival 
One of the biggest non-football events hosted by the stadium is the Arona Summer Festival, an emerging electronic music festival that's held in collaboration with the Ministry of Sound that has counted some of the world's biggest names in DJ'ing as part of its line-ups. In the first year of the festival in August 2011, the festival was headlined by David Guetta, with other notable performances from Roger Sanchez, Rinôçérôse and The Zombie Kids.

The second year of the festival, held in August 2012, didn't disappoint, with the second edition being headlined by Avicii whilst it featured performances by Dimitri Vegas & Like Mike, Sean Paul and Nervo. Continuing its procurement of some of the world's biggest DJs, the third edition of the festival was headlined by Swedish DJ Alesso, whilst Nervo and The Zombie Kids returned for their second performance at the festival. Other notable performers include Redfoo, of LMFAO and Michael Calfan.

In subsequent years, the festival has seen performances from Armin van Buuren, Brian Cross, Danny Ávila, Deadmau5, Deorro, Don Diablo, Guy Gerber, Julian Jordan, Kryder, Nicky Romero, Oliver Heldens, Otto Knows, Pendulum, Rudimental, Sander van Doorn, Showtek, Steve Angello, Steve Aoki, Tchami, Tom Staar and Ummet Ozcan.

See also 

 CD Marino

References 

Football venues in the Canary Islands
Buildings and structures in Tenerife
Sports venues completed in 1969
Sport in Tenerife
 Multi-purpose stadiums in Spain
1969 establishments in Spain